In enzymology, a 3-deoxy-8-phosphooctulonate synthase is an enzyme that catalyzes the chemical reaction

phosphoenolpyruvate + D-arabinose 5-phosphate + H2O  2-dehydro-3-deoxy-D-octonate 8-phosphate + phosphate

The 3 substrates of this enzyme are phosphoenolpyruvate, D-arabinose 5-phosphate, and H2O, whereas its two products are 2-dehydro-3-deoxy-D-octonate 8-phosphate and phosphate.

This enzyme participates in lipopolysaccharide biosynthesis.

Nomenclature 

This enzyme belongs to the family of transferases, specifically those transferring aryl or alkyl groups other than methyl groups.  The systematic name of this enzyme class is phosphoenolpyruvate:D-arabinose-5-phosphate C-(1-carboxyvinyl)transferase (phosphate-hydrolysing, 2-carboxy-2-oxoethyl-forming). Other names in common use include 2-dehydro-3-deoxy-D-octonate-8-phosphate, D-arabinose-5-phosphate-lyase (pyruvate-phosphorylating), 2-dehydro-3-deoxy-phosphooctonate aldolase, 2-keto-3-deoxy-8-phosphooctonic synthetase, 3-deoxy-D-manno-octulosonate-8-phosphate synthase, 3-deoxy-D-mannooctulosonate-8-phosphate synthetase, 3-deoxyoctulosonic 8-phosphate synthetase, KDOP synthase, and phospho-2-keto-3-deoxyoctonate aldolase.

References

Further reading 

 
 
 

EC 2.5.1
Enzymes of known structure